Kiss the Girls and Make Them Die (Italian: Se tutte le donne del mondo... (Operazione Paradiso)) is a James Bond spoof film released in 1966 as an Italian-American co-production between Dino De Laurentiis' Cinematografica and Columbia Pictures. Directed by Henry Levin, with stars Mike Connors, Dorothy Provine, and as the villain, Raf Vallone, it was originally filmed from January to March 1966 under the title Operation Paradise and distributed in some parts of the English-speaking world as If All the Women in the World.

Plot
Financed by Red China, a Brazilian industrialist (Vallone) plans to sterilize the United States through massive doses of radiation courtesy of his satellite. He double crosses the Chinese by scheming to sterilize the entire Earth, then personally repopulate the planet with beautiful women he has kidnapped and is holding in suspended animation. A down-to-earth CIA agent (Michael Connors), an aristocratic female MI-6 agent (Provine), and her chauffeur (Terry-Thomas), driving a Rolls-Royce car filled with spy gadgets, team up to stop the madman.

Cast

Music credits
Music and special musical effects by Mario Nascimbene
Conducted by Roberto Pregadio
Harmonica soloist John Sebastian
The song "Kiss the Girls and Make Them Die" 
is sung by Lydia MacDonald
Lyrics by Howard Greenfield

Background
An example of the mod Eurospy form, then at the height of its popularity, Kiss the Girls and Make Them Die reflected that genre's formula of exaggerated semicomic action filmed in colorful locales around the world (Rio de Janeiro in this case), frequently using average-reputation American directors (Henry Levin subsequently directed two Matt Helm films) and American leads best known for starring in television shows and appearing in occasional films. As far as the casting for this production was concerned, Michael Connors had earlier been the star of a 1959–60 crime series, Tightrope!, and the following year, after streamlining his stage name to "Mike Connors", starred as the long-running private eye, Mannix (1967–75), while Dorothy Provine was one of the stars in The Alaskans (1959–60) and The Roaring 20's (1960–62). Two years earlier, Provine and Connors played key supporting roles as second leads in the 1964 Jack Lemmon–Romy Schneider comedy vehicle Good Neighbor Sam. All the other Kiss the Girls cast members were primarily recognizable as regular players in European films, including co-stars Raf Vallone, Margaret Lee, and comedy relief Terry-Thomas, who was given a special "and" billing at the end of the actors' credits.

This film was rushed into release by Columbia Pictures to avoid colliding with their better-known James Bond satire, Casino Royale. The plot of Kiss the Girls and Make Them Die is similar to the James Bond film Moonraker, which was released 13 years later.

Production
Michael Connors recalled that Columbia Pictures gave him the lead after he had been a strong contender for the role of Matt Helm that Dean Martin played. Connors said that Dorothy Provine was whisked to Rome for a week, returning in a glamorous makeover. While Connors portrayed a Sean Connery-type American superspy, Dorothy Provine played her role with an upper-class British accent similar to Lady Penelope Creighton-Ward of the Thunderbirds TV series. Her character rode a gadget-filled Rolls-Royce driven by an Aloysius Parker-type chauffeur played by Terry-Thomas. The movie was filmed on location in Rio de Janeiro and Rome with Dino De Laurentiis spending a lot of money on production.

Connors also recalled that he did the stuntwork of dangling from a rope ladder attached to a helicopter flying off the Christ the Redeemer statue in Rio when the local stuntman refused to do it. Connors said that they were the only film company ever granted permission to film at the landmark.

Reception
A review of the film (bylined "Murf.") in the January 11, 1967 issue of Variety stated, "Undoubtedly, there will be some people who will enjoy "Kiss the Girls And Make Them Die," but fact is that producer Dino De Laurentiis has made a limp, banal spy spoof, inept in all departments. Pace is plodding, dialog pallid, direction pedestrian, acting an embarrassment, and technical composition awkward."

In film guides
Leonard Maltin's Movie Guide (2014 edition) gives Kiss the Girls and Make Them Die its lowest rating, BOMB, describing it as a "[D]ull spy spoof" and commenting that "a satellite capable of sterilizing the world" is "something Bond, Flint, and Matt Helm wouldn't mind. Awful film." Steven H. Scheuer's Movies on TV and Videocassette (1993–1994 edition) had a barely higher opinion, allowing 1½ stars (out of 4) and dispatching it with the final line, "[T]ongue-in-cheek secret-agent stuff doesn't come off: a yawn."

The Motion Picture Guide assigned the film its lowest ranking of 1 star (out of 5), proclaiming that "[T]here is little to recommend in this secret-agent spoof" and pointing out that "[E]verything from the sloppy special effects to the irritating music radiates an uncanny cheapness. Dubbed in English."

Two specialized guidebooks arrive at a split vote. Michael Weldon's Psychotronic Encyclopedia of Film (1983 edition, page 407) agrees with the denigrators, giving it a plot outline that ends with the words, "[T]he worst Bond imitation known to man. With Terry-Thomas, Margaret Lee, Beverly Adams, Marilu Tolo, Nazi scientists, and Communist Chinese. Filmed in Rio De Janeiro. Connors did Mannix next." On the other hand, John Stanley's Creature Features The Science Fiction, Fantasy, and Horror Movie Guide (2000 edition) decided that "[A]lthough a pale copy of 007's exploits, it has a sparkle to its comedy, gorgeous women in figure-flattering wardrobes, and scenic action set against picturesque Rio." After describing the plot, Stanley concludes with, "Michael Connors walks somnambulistic through his role as super agent Kelly who has minipistols hidden in his clothing and is always eating bananas. A standout is Terry-Thomas as a chauffeur secret agent. Directed by Henry Levin and Dino Maiuri. Dorothy Provine portrays Connors' charming, sexy contact."

The sole British cinema compiler to acknowledge the film, Leslie Halliwell in his 1985 Film and Video Guide 5th edition, gave no stars (Halliwell's top rating is 4), dismissing it as a "[P]atchy James Bond spoof."

See also

 Outline of James Bond
 Eurospy

References

Bibliography

External links
 
 
 
 
 
 Kiss the Girls and Make Them Die at TV Guide (revised form of this 1987 write-up was originally published in The Motion Picture Guide)
 
 If All the Women in the World (Full Movie)

1966 films
English-language Italian films
Italian spy comedy films
1960s spy comedy films
Italian parody films
Columbia Pictures films
Films set in Rio de Janeiro (city)
Films directed by Henry Levin
Sterilization in fiction
Films produced by Dino De Laurentiis
Films scored by Mario Nascimbene
Parody films based on James Bond films
1960s parody films
1966 comedy films
1960s English-language films
1960s Italian films